Robert Earl Bryant (born May 19, 1937) is a former American football end who played one season in the American Football League (AFL) with the Dallas Texans. He played college football at the University of Texas and attended Plainview High School in Plainview, Texas.

References

External links
Just Sports Stats
College stats

Living people
1937 births
American football ends
Texas Longhorns football players
Dallas Texans (AFL) players
Plainview High School (Texas) alumni